Priya Balasubramaniam is an engineer with a background in mechanical engineering, supply chain management, marketing and software engineering. She is currently the vice president of Core Technologies Operations and iPhone Operations at Apple Inc.

Career 

Priya joined Apple Inc. in 2001. In June 2006 she became Director for Core Technologies Procurement which included touch panels, LCD and batteries. In July 2010 she became a Senior Director in the company. Since October 2014, she has worked as Vice President of Core Technologies & iPhone Operations.

While working at Apple she has been instrumental in negotiating a new deal to have Apple products manufactured in India, one of the world’s fastest-growing smartphone markets, and diversifying its supply chain beyond China. In September 2019, Apple confirmed its plans to expand to India following an easing of the country’s rules regarding foreign companies.

Honors and awards 

In December 2017, Balasubramaniam was awarded an honorary Doctorate of Engineering by Michigan State University.

In February 2017, she was named the fifth most powerful female engineer in an article published by Business Insider titled "The 43 most powerful female engineers of 2017".

In June 2018, she was named the fourth most powerful female engineer in the Business Insider article "The 39 most powerful female engineers of 2018".

References

1972 births
Living people
Indian mechanical engineers
Bangalore University alumni
Michigan State University alumni
Apple Inc. employees